Hapoel Bnei Lod Rakevet F.C. are a football club, from the central Israeli city of Lod. Home matches are played at the Lod Municipal Stadium.

History
The club was founded in 1969 and joined Liga Dalet, then the fifth and lowest tier of Israeli football league system. In 1997, Hapoel Bnei Lod merged with Hapoel Rakevet Lod (both clubs played in Liga Gimel Central division) and formed Hapoel Bnei Lod Rakevet, under the management of Abu Subhi.

After the merger, the club won Liga Gimel Central division and reached Liga Bet for the first time in the 1998–99 season. In 2003–04 they won Liga Bet South B division. The following season the club won Liga Alef South division and promotion to Liga Artzit (the third tier). The winning run continued in 2005–06 as the club claimed the Liga Artzit championship to win promotion to Liga Leumit.

The club was close to achieve promotion to the Israeli Premier League at the end of the 2011–12 season, when they finished level in points with the first placed, Hapoel Ramat Gan. the two clubs faced in a decisive promotion play-off held in HaMoshava Stadium in Petah Tikva. Bnei Lod lost 0–2 and remained in Liga Leumit.

In the 2013–14 and 2014–15 seasons, the club finished third, one place short from promotion to the Israeli Premier League.

On 9 December 2014, the club won their first ever piece of silverware, winning the 2014–15 second division's Toto Cup after beating Bnei Yehuda 2–0.

Current squad
 As to 12 September 2021

Past players

David Abidor

Honours

League

Cup competitions

Notable managers

Gili Landau (born 1958)

External links
Hapoel Bnei Lod Rakevet Israel Football Association

References

 
Lod
Lod
1969 establishments in Israel
Association football clubs established in 1969
Sport in Lod
Arab-Israeli football clubs